Ian Paul Smith (born 22 January 1976 in Easington, County Durham), known as Paul Smith, is an English footballer who played in the Football League for Burnley, Oldham Athletic, Hartlepool United and Sheffield Wednesday.

Career
Smith turned professional in July 1992 with Burnley. He was subject of multimillion-pound bids from Arsenal, West Ham United, Aston Villa, Liverpool and Everton and was widely considered to have the best left foot outside the Premier League. Smith joined Hartlepool United on a free transfer in November 2001. He quickly settled in as a first team regular, topping the Division's assists charts (with 37) as Hartlepool reached the Division Three play-offs. He rejoined former Hartlepool manager Chris Turner as he moved to Sheffield Wednesday when his Hartlepool contract expired at the end of the 2002–03 season, after helping the club to promotion. He scored a goal on his second substitute appearance and a 20-yard volley on his full debut, but the knee injury which deprived him of the chance to face off against his former team in the play-off final, forced his retirement from professional football. He was released shortly after Wednesday won promotion to the Football League Championship.

In January 2006 he played a few games for Conference North club Alfreton Town, from where he joined Conference National side Kidderminster Harriers in February, but made just three substitute appearances for Harriers before leaving in the summer of 2006.  He signed for Sheffield F.C. in the summer of 2007, swept the board of player-of-the-year awards for the 2008–09 season, and left the club in January 2010. He joined Hucknall Town in June 2010.

External links

References

1976 births
Sportspeople from Easington, County Durham
Footballers from County Durham
Living people
English footballers
Burnley F.C. players
Oldham Athletic A.F.C. players
Torquay United F.C. players
Hartlepool United F.C. players
Sheffield F.C. players
Sheffield Wednesday F.C. players
Alfreton Town F.C. players
Hucknall Town F.C. players
Kidderminster Harriers F.C. players
Association football defenders
Association football midfielders